The Complete Radio One Sessions is a compilation album by Napalm Death featuring all tracks recorded for BBC radio sessions. Tracks 1–12, which were recorded for the John Peel show, were previously released as The Peel Sessions. There are three versions of The Peel Sessions: 1987, 1989, and finally, the album that compiled all the sessions together, the 1993 version. All these tracks were also released as part of this longer compilation The Complete Radio One Sessions.

Track listing

Credits
Tracks 1 to 8 (Tracks 1 to 4 - 1987, tracks 5 to 8 - 1988)
Lee Dorrian - lead vocals
Bill Steer - guitars
Shane Embury - bass
Mick Harris - drums, backing vocals

Tracks 9 to 12 (1990)
Mark "Barney" Greenway - lead vocals
Jesse Pintado - lead guitar
Mitch Harris - rhythm guitar
Shane Embury - bass
Mick Harris - drums, backing vocalsTracks 13 to 16 (1996)'''
Mark "Barney" Greenway - vocals
Jesse Pintado - guitars
Shane Embury - bass
Danny Herrera - drums

Peel Sessions recordings
Napalm Death compilation albums
Napalm Death live albums
2000 live albums
2000 compilation albums